Feiring may refer to:

Places:
 Feiring, Norway, area in the municipality of Eidsvoll

People:
Alice Feiring, American author and wine critic

See also
 Fairing (disambiguation)